Excess All Areas is a 2009 album by Australian singer/comedian Kevin Bloody Wilson. The title is a pun on "Access All Areas" (text often found on backstage passes at concerts) being a homonym with the title in Australian English.

Track listing
All tracks written by Denis Bryant.

"Nigel & Wilma" – 3:00
"Old Home Videos" – 3:37
"Bring Back The Biff" – 3:09
"Butter Face" – 2:41
"You Can't Call Me Kev Anymore" – 3:23
"Nanna Never Farted" – 2:57
"The Cougar Song" – 3:11
"Common Sense" – 3:37
"Me Beers Cut Off" – 3:29
"Readin Me My Wrongs" – 3:32

References

External links

2009 albums
Kevin Bloody Wilson albums
2000s comedy albums